Lenny Cooper (born 1988 in Jacksonville, North Carolina) is an American country rap singer-songwriter. Cooper is signed to Colt Ford's record label, Average Joes Entertainment, and released his debut album, Diesel Fuel, in 2012. Cooper's second album, Mud Dynasty, was released on May 7, 2013. It sold 3,000 copies in its first week of release, debuting at number 34 on the Billboard Top Country Albums chart and number 198 on the Billboard 200.

Cooper released his third album, The Grind, on August 26, 2014. The album features collaborations with Ford, Bucky Covington and Bubba Sparxxx. It sold 2,400 copies in its first week of release, debuting at number 17 on the Billboard Top Country Albums chart and number 142 on the Billboard 200.

Discography

Albums

Singles

Music videos

References

External links

1988 births
American country singer-songwriters
American male singer-songwriters
Average Joes Entertainment artists
Country musicians from North Carolina
Country rap musicians
Living people
21st-century American singers
21st-century American male singers
Singer-songwriters from North Carolina